Amulet Peak is a prominent  elevation mountain summit located  east-northeast of Palmer, in the northern Chugach Mountains of the U.S. state of Alaska. This landmark of the Matanuska Valley is set midway between Anchorage and Glennallen, at mile 94 of the Glenn Highway. Established climbing routes on this peak include the east and south ridges, as well as the north face which is the most difficult and dangerous. The first ascent of this peak was made in 1968 by John Vincent Hoeman, his wife Grace Hoeman, and William Babcock, via the south ridge.

Climate

Based on the Köppen climate classification, Amulet Peak is located in a subarctic climate zone with long, cold, snowy winters, and mild summers. Weather systems coming off the Gulf of Alaska are forced upwards by the Chugach Mountains (orographic lift), causing heavy precipitation in the form of rainfall and snowfall. Temperatures can drop below −20 °C with wind chill factors below −30 °C. This climate supports small unnamed glaciers and permanent snowfields on its slopes. The months May through June offer the most favorable weather for climbing or viewing. Precipitation runoff from the mountain drains into Monument and Gravel Creeks, which are tributaries of the Matanuska River.

See also

Matanuska Formation
Geography of Alaska

References

External links
 Weather forecast: National Weather Service
 Amulet Peak with Lion Head: Flickr photo
 Account of first ascent: American Alpine Club

Mountains of Alaska
Landforms of Matanuska-Susitna Borough, Alaska
Mountains of Matanuska-Susitna Borough, Alaska
North American 2000 m summits